The Great Book of Nature (Italian: Il Grande Libro della Natura) is an animated children's television series produced by Mondo TV and SEK Studio in 1999. It is composed of non-sequential episodes hosted by a bear, this series features various kind of creatures, such as fish, insects and birds, while depicting their different habitats - whether sea, land or sky. At the end of each episode, the audience is treated to instructive sets of questions and answers that teach young viewers about a given creature's various kind of behaviours. 
There are 54 different episode of it of different stories. Before being compiled into a television series, the animated shorts were likely used as theatrical propaganda cartoons in North Korea.

This show was telecast in India in Just Kids! on Sahara TV, and in Arab world on Spacetoon, and in Poland on TVP3 to summer-autumn (July–October) 2000 and winter-spring (January–April) 2001 and also in Russia on TRC Petersburg (St-Petersburg, 3ch VHF1) to winter-spring (or February–March for Sure) 2004 and Moscow channel "Stolica" (VHF3) to winter (December–January) 2004-2005.

This show was shown in various countries in different languages after Mondo TV went public.

Episodes

The Hedgehog
The Raccoon
The Monkey
The Bear
The Rabbit
The Wolf
The Turtle
The Red Fox
The Grizzly Bear
The Squirrel
The Brown Bear
The Rat
The Wild Cat
The Hare
The Butterfly
The Bee
The Dragonfly
The Red Ant
The Hornet
The Fly
The Ladybird
The Duck
The Magpie
The Swan
The Woodpecker
The Crow
The Sparrow
The Goldfinch
The Robin
The Stork
The Frog
The Sea Turtle
The Goat
The Pig
The Rooster
The Bull
The Domestic Goat
The Chicken
The Horse
The Cuttle Fish
The Octopus
The Crab
The Fighting Fish
The Golden Fish
The Killer Whale
The Dolphin
The Dragon
The Winged Horse
The Cat
The Dog
The Bulldog
The Greyhound
The Poodle
The Cocker Spaniel

References

1990s Italian drama television series
2000s Italian drama television series
1990s North Korean television series
2000s North Korean television series
1990s animated television series
2000s animated television series
1999 Italian television series debuts
2000 Italian television series endings
Italian children's animated adventure television series
Italian children's animated drama television series
Italian children's animated fantasy television series
North Korean animated television series
Children's education television series
Nature educational television series
Animation anthology series
Television series with live action and animation
English-language television shows
Italian-language television shows
RAI original programming
Animated television shows based on films
Animated television series about bears
Animated television series about mammals
Animated television series about birds
Animated television series about insects
Animated television series about fish
Animated television series about reptiles and amphibians
Anthropomorphic animals
Television shows set in North Korea
Forests in fiction
Farms in fiction
Oceans and seas in fiction